Line 22 is a future subway line on the Shanghai Metro. It will be located in south-west Shanghai near Dachang in Baoshan District and Taopu in Putuo District. The line was announced by the Municipal government in 2016.

References

Shanghai Metro lines
Proposed buildings and structures in Shanghai
Shanghai